Nimesh Kariyawasam (born 8 February 1994) is a Sri Lankan cricketer. He made his List A debut for Galle Cricket Club in Tier B of the 2015–16 Premier Limited Overs Tournament on 28 November 2015. He made his first-class debut for Panadura Sports Club in Tier B of the 2016–17 Premier League Tournament on 23 January 2017.

References

External links
 

1994 births
Living people
Sri Lankan cricketers
Galle Cricket Club cricketers
Kalutara District cricketers
Panadura Sports Club cricketers
People from Galle